Kilombero Bridge is a bridge of Tanzania.

It links the towns of Ifakara and Mahenge. Construction work began in November 2012 and was completed in February 2017.

References

External links
DETAILED ENGINEERING DESIGN OF KILOMBERO BRIDGE AND ITS APPROACH ROADS

Bridges in Tanzania